The JPX PUL 425, also called simply the JPX 425, is a French twin-cylinder, horizontally opposed, two-stroke aircraft engine.

The engine was produced only until the company went out of business in the early 1990s. The company was re-formed but the engine remains out of production and unsupported for parts.

Design and development
The engine has two cylinders in a horizontally opposed configuration, with cooling fins on the cylinders. The single ignition system uses a coil and points. Fuel is metered by a single Tillotson butterfly-type carburetor. Starting is by a recoil starter system with electric start as an option.

The 425 has a redline rpm of 4600 and does not use a reduction drive. Its weight of just  gives the engine a high power-to-weight ratio.

Applications
Latécoère 225
Lazair 2
Lazair SS
Lazair Series III
Zenair Zipper

Specifications (425)

See also

References

Air-cooled aircraft piston engines
Two-stroke aircraft piston engines